Francesc "Nino" Buscató Durlán (born April 21, 1940), commonly known as either Nino Buscató or Francisco Buscató, is a Spanish former professional basketball player and basketball coach. At 5 feet 10 inches (1.78 m) tall, he played at the point guard position. He was named to the FIBA European Selection five times (1968, 1969, 1970, 1971, 1973), and he was also named one of FIBA's 50 Greatest Players in 1991. In 1970 he shared UNESCO International Fair Play Award with another Spaniard, soccer player Pedro Zaballa.

Club career
Buscató spent the major part of his club career playing with FC Barcelona and Joventut Badalona. He won two Spanish League championship titles (1959, 1968) and two Spanish Cups (1959, 1969).

National team career
Buscató represented at international competition the senior Spain national team (1959–1973). He won a EuroBasket silver medal at the EuroBasket 1973, and was named to the All-Tournament Team, averaging 11 points per game in the tournament. He also competed at three Olympic Games.

References

External links
FIBA Profile

1940 births
Living people
Basketball players at the 1960 Summer Olympics
Basketball players at the 1968 Summer Olympics
Basketball players at the 1972 Summer Olympics
FC Barcelona Bàsquet players
Joventut Badalona players
Olympic basketball players of Spain
Point guards
Spanish basketball coaches
Spanish men's basketball players